Pozorrubio, officially the Municipality of Pozorrubio (Ilocano: Ili ti Pozorrubio), is a 1st class municipality in the province of Pangasinan, Philippines. According to the 2020 census, it has a population of 74,729 people.

Often, the town's name is written as "Pozzorubio", but the correct spelling is "Pozorrubio". Its land area is 8,965 hectares.

History
Pozorrubio began as Claris, a hamlet and later barrio of San Jacinto, Pangasinan. It was named in honour of Juan de la Cruz Palaris, leader of the 1762 Palaris Revolt in Binalatongan (today San Carlos City).

Wealthy landowners Don Benito Magno, Domingo Aldana, Pedro Itliong, Bartolomé Naniong, Bernardo Olarte, Pedro Salcedo, Juan Ancheta, Antonio Sabolboro, José Songcuan, Tobías Paragas, Francisco Callao, and Baltazar Casiano y Salazar filed a petition on June 19, 1868, with Governor-General Carlos María de la Torre y Navacerrada through the Pangasinan Alcalde Mayor, requesting the conversion of Barrio Claris into an independent town. It included the modern barangays of Nantangalan, Maambal, Bantugan, Dilan, Malasin, and Talogtog. The town's seat of government was at the original site of Barrio Claris, now Barangay Amagbagan.

The local parish priest, Rev. Fr. Asencio OP, and a certain Domingo Castro of Lingayen, also filed petitions to the Governor-General. Magno, Castro, Aldana, and Don Agustín Venezuela travelled to Manila by carruaje (stagecoach pulled by four horses) to personally deliver the second petition, which Queen Isabel II of Spain gave assent to on August 13, 1868.

The request was granted on November 3, 1869, and Claris became a Municipio on January 13, 1870. Fr Asencio suggested the new name of "Pozorrubio" to Governor-General De la Torre: it was in his honour as he was also Count of Pozor, with the addition of "Rubio".

Saint Philomena was chosen as the town's patron saint, with a feast day of August 13, the anniversary of Queen Isabel II elevating the barrio into a town. In the Catholic Church, she is venerated as a young virgin martyr whose remains were discovered in 1802 in the Catacombs of Priscilla. Three tiles enclosing the tomb bore a Latin inscription that was taken to indicate that her name was Filumena, anglicised as "Philomena". Her relics were translated to Mugnano del Cardinale in 1805 and became the focus of widespread devotion, with several miracles credited to her intercession, including the healing of Venerable Pauline Jaricot in 1835. Saint John Vianney attributed to her the miraculous cures people said were his work.

The town's twelve intelligentsia formed the first Communidad or Town Council (Tribunal or Presidencia, the Town Hall):

 Don Benito Magno
 Don Domingo Aldana
 Don Juan Ancheta
 Don Francisco Callao
 Don Pedro Itliong
 Don Bartolomé Naniong
 Don Bernardo Olarte
 Don Tobías Paragas
 Don Antonio Sabaldoro
 Don Pedro Salcedo
 Don José Songcuan
 Don Protacio Venezuela

Magno was elected on November 3, 1868, as the first Gobernadorcillo and began his term on January 1, 1869. Don José Sanchéz and Don Agustín Venezuela donated the plaza lot.

The parish priest of Pozorrubio's mother town San Jacinto, Fr. Pablo Almazan, appointed Doña Francisca Aldana-Magno, the wife of Don Benito, to teach in the only school set up in Claris. The town was then relocated to Cablong. On December 18, 1880, Gobernadorcillo Don Bernardo Olarte inaugurated the new site, with a new parish priest, Rev. Fr. Joaquín Gonzáles presiding over a brand-new church its attached convento.

During the Second World War, Imperial Japanese troops executed Filomeno G. Magno, a lawyer and the direct heir of Don Benito Magno, in 1942. Don Benito Estaris Magno's mother, Doña María Estaris (Akolaw Inkew) was Benito's first teacher, and his wife Doña Francisca was the schoolteacher in Claris.

On April 19, 2012, Archbishop Oscar V. Cruz declared false the alleged apparition of an aswang (a generic term for a ghoul) in Barangay Villegas.

Geography

Barangays
Pozorrubio is politically subdivided into 34 barangays. These barangays are headed by elected officials: Barangay Captain, Barangay Council, whose members are called Barangay Councilors. All are elected every three years.

Climate

Demographics

Economy

Main crops: rice, sugarcane, tobacco, mango, vegetables and legumes, coconut, corn and cotton
Cottage industries: bamboo and rattan products for exports, swords, knives, bolos, and other metal crafts
Other industries: sand and gravel, concrete hollow blocks, leather craft, gold panning, fresh water fishponds, poultry and cattle raising

Government
Pozorrubio, belonging to the fifth congressional district of the province of Pangasinan, is governed by a mayor designated as its local chief executive and by a municipal council as its legislative body in accordance with the Local Government Code. The mayor, vice mayor, and the councilors are elected directly by the people through an election which is being held every three years.

The chief executives of the town are Mayor Artemio Q. Chan and Vice Mayor Ernesto T. Go, with eight Sangguniang Bayan members or councilors who hold office at the Town Hall and Legislative Building's Session Hall.

Elected officials

Education
The town's foremost school is Benigno V Aldana National High School (BVANHS, formerly Pozorrubio High School).
 29 elementary schools 
 nine secondary schools

Private schools 
 University of Luzon – Pozorrubio
 Saint Philomena's Academy
 Mary, Help of Christians Learning Center Foundation, Inc.
 Mary, Help of Christians Boarding School, Inc.

Tourism
The town's interesting points and events include:

Town Fiesta – January 11 (Pozorrubio 142rd Foundation Day & Town Fiesta Schedule of Activities)
 Patopat Festival – Frontage, Executive Building.
Legislative Building and the municipal library.
The Plaza pergola (Don Domingo M. Magno, 1930s with authentic marker, the colorful history of Pozorrubio)
Plaza Park and Children's Park
Pozorrubio-Iligan City Friendship Park
Public Market
Quibuar Springs, Guernica Hill

Saint Jude Thaddeus Church

Saint Jude Thaddeus Parish Church is under the jurisdiction of the Roman Catholic Archdiocese of Lingayen-Dagupan, Roman Catholic Diocese of Urdaneta (Coordinates: 16°6'42"N 120°32'42"E). Its feast day is October 28; the present parish priest is Rev. Fr Teófilo L. Calicdan, while the parochial vicar is Rev. Fr Christopher E. Sison.

The town and parish were founded on March 12, 1834, by Rev. Fr Domingo Naval, the vicar of San Jacinto. The 1839–1842 saw the erection of an ermita amid the creation of Pozorrubio as Municipio on January 30, 1870, per Royal Decree of the Governor-General.

The temporary church in Cablong (now the town proper) was opened and consecrated on July 26, 1879, by Rev. Fr Julián López, vicar of San Jacinto; Rev. Fr Joaquín Gonzáles was the first parish priest until 1884. Rev. Fr Silvestre Fernández (1887–1893) added the convento and the escuelas of caton and the old, brick-walled cemetery. Mortar and ladrillo were used for house construction. Rev. Fr Mariano Rodríguez (1893–1899) built a bigger brick church (75.57 m long, 23 m 50 cm wide, with walls of 4 m high), but it lay unfinished due to the Philippine-American War.

Rev. Fr Lucilo Meris (1899–1925), the first native Filipino parish priest of Pozorrubio, shortened the church to 42 m, while American bombers destroyed the church complex  on January 7, 1945, as it retook the Philippines from the Japanese. It was rebuilt by Rev. Fr Emilio Cinense (1947–1952), who founded Saint Philomena's Academy in 1948 and later became Bishop. Rev. Fr Alfredo Cayabyab (1954–1967) rebuilt the church,  while Rev. Fr Primo García and Rev. Fr Arturo Aquino helped reconstruct the present church.

Gallery

References

 (Published work: "Awaran na Inletneg na Baley na Pozorrubio", 1940 by Atty. Filomeno G. Magno, Pozorrubio)

External links

 Pozorrubio Profile at PhilAtlas.com
  Municipal Profile at the National Competitiveness Council of the Philippines
 Pozorrubio at the Pangasinan Government Website
 Local Governance Performance Management System
 [ Philippine Standard Geographic Code]
 Philippine Census Information
 Pozorrubio Online

Municipalities of Pangasinan